Two ships in the United States Navy have been named USS Kane for Elisha Kent Kane:

  was a  commissioned in 1920, reclassified as the high speed transport  in 1943, and decommissioned in 1946.
  was put into service in 1965, struck from the Naval Vessel Register in 2001 and transferred to Turkey.

United States Navy ship names